Sia Figiel (born 1967 Apia, Samoa) is an American contemporary Samoan novelist, poet, and painter.

Early life 
Sia Figiel grew up amidst traditional Samoan singing and poetry, which heavily influenced her writing. Figiel's greatest influence and inspiration in her career is the Samoan novelist and poet, Albert Wendt.
Her formal schooling was conducted in Samoa and New Zealand where she also began a Bachelor of Arts, which was later completed at Whitworth College (United States). She travelled in Europe and completed writers' residencies at the University of the South Pacific, Suva, and the University of Technology, Sydney.

Career 

Sia Figiel's poetry won the Polynesian Literary Competition in 1994 and her novel Where We Once Belonged won the 1997 Best First Book award in the South East Asia/South Pacific Region of the Commonwealth Writers' Prize.  Her works have been translated into French, German, Catalan, Danish, Spanish, Swedish, Turkish and Portuguese.

In 2000 Figiel performed her Oceanic poetry at the University of Hawaii's twenty-fifth annual Pacific Island Studies conference.
The performances of Figiel and Teresia Teaiwa were recorded at this conference and subsequently released in a joint production with Hawai'i Dub Machine records and 'Elepaio Press. The album is titled Terenesia.
Sia Figiel has also been a contributor to The Contemporary Pacific journal on multiple occasions, including publications in 1998 and 2010.

Selected poetry by Figiel was included in UPU, a compilation of Pacific Island writers’ work which was first presented at the Silo Theatre as part of the Auckland Arts Festival in March 2020. UPU was remounted as part of the Kia Mau Festival in Wellington in June 2021.

Personal life 

Sia Figiel's life has been affected by diabetes in various ways. Members of her family have had diabetes, and related complications caused the death of both Figiel's mother and father. In 2003 Figiel herself was diagnosed with Type two diabetes.  Figiel initially kept her diagnosis secret as she felt it to be a sign of weakness and did not want her condition to shape her as a writer and a public figure. The deaths of family members and friends from complications from diabetes eventually impelled her to speak up about the disease.
In 2012, in parallel with a move to the United States, Figiel began to address her diabetes both publicly and personally, making appearances at various conferences and university campuses. Subsequently she served as an advocate in the Pacific region by sharing her personal experiences to help with efforts to address the causes of diabetes. Figiel has acted as a role model for good health by targeting both those with diabetes and those who are working to prevent it. In 2014, her condition had improved sufficiently to enable her to complete the Nautica Malibu Triathlon. Figiel's story was featured on CNN where she discussed her struggle with food and explained how because she is from American Samoa where food is such a major part of the culture, she had difficulty managing her diabetes. After moving to Utah, USA she lost 100 pounds.  Her diabetes resulted in major dental complications and many occasions of very low blood sugar. Her young son was able to help her, as he knew how to inject her with insulin. According to Figiel, he "...saved her life continuously during this time."

Novels and poetry

Where We Once Belonged 

Sia Figiel's Where We Once Belonged is a Samoan novel set in the fictitious village of Malaefou. It is focused around the titular character, Alofa (a name that literally means love in the Samoan language) and her various encounters with violence and sex.  In telling this story, Figiel writes with complex prose that are highly poetic and dream-like. Her writing style is emblematic of Su'ife-filoi; a Samoan form of story telling centred around the "quilt-like weaving of words". Where We Once Belonged marks the first instance of a novel published in the United States that is written by a Samoan female. The novel was adapted into a play by Dave Armstrong, a 2008 production of the play winning the Chapman Tripp theatre award for best new New Zealand play.

They Who Do Not Grieve 

In her second novel, They Who Do Not Grieve, published in 2003 by Kaya Press, Figiel incorporates her poetic talents through the voices of three generations of women who descend from Samoa and New Zealand. Writing in a highly poetic medium, They Who Do Not Grieve tells the story of two twin sisters who introduce tattooing to Samoa. Through this themes of self-determination, femininity, and coming of age are addressed.

The Girl in the Moon Circle 

The Girl in the Moon Circle is a collection of poetic works published in 1996 by the Institute of Pacific Studies. It depicts life in Samoan society from the point of view of a ten-year-old girl named Samoana. This semi-autobiographical collection illustrates the simplistic aspects of Samoan culture, along with the commonplace experiences of a young ten-year-old girl, such as school, friends, family, church and boy crushes.

To a Young Artist in Contemplation 
Figiel's To a Young Artist in Contemplation is a collection of poetry and prose published in 1998 by the Institute of Pacific Studies.

Freelove - A novel 
In her novel Freelove, the 17 year old protagonist, Inosia Alofafua Afatasi from the fictional Western Samoan village of Nu'uolemanusa is sent by her mother on an errand to the city of Apia. A chance encounter there with her spiritual brother Loage Viliamu, the son of the pastor in her village and her school teacher, leads her into an unexpected and forbidden relationship. The tale comments on social and communal changes, and was published in 2017 on Kindle and in print in 2018 by Little Island Press.

List of works 

Novels
 Where We Once Belonged (New Zealand: Pasifika, 1996)  Review
 They Who do not Grieve (1999) ; Kaya Press, 2003, 
Poetry & Stories
 The Girl in the Moon Circle (1996) 
 To a Young Artist in Contemplation, Pacific Writing Forum, USP, 1998,  Excerpt
Anthologies

References

Relevant literature
 Ramsay, Raylene. 2018. "Indigenous Women Writers in the Pacific: Déwé Gorodé, Sia Figiel, Patricia Grace." Postcolonial Text 7.1:1-18. (2012).

External links 
 A Conversation with Sia Figiel at Frigatezine
 Between the steel bars poem at nzepc
 They Who do not Grieve recording of excerpt
 Songs of the fat brown woman poem
 A Garland of Exile and Belonging Time Pacific
 Bibliography
 Sia Figiel profile at The South Project

1967 births
Living people
Samoan women novelists
Samoan women writers
Samoan women poets
Samoan painters
20th-century novelists
20th-century women writers
20th-century Samoan poets